Troillet is a surname. Notable people with the surname include: 

 Florent Troillet (born 1981), Swiss ski mountaineer
 Jean Troillet (born 1948), Swiss mountain guide
 Marie Troillet (born 1983), Swiss ski mountaineer, sister of Florent